Justin Arch "Jay" Williamson IV (born February 7, 1967) is an American professional golfer who has played on the PGA Tour and the Nationwide Tour.

Williamson was born in St. Louis, Missouri. He attended Trinity College and was a member of the Division III baseball and hockey teams. After graduating from Trinity College, he turned professional in 1990.

Williamson has no PGA Tour victories, although he has finished second twice, both playoff losses – to Hunter Mahan at the 2007 Travelers Championship, and to Kenny Perry at the 2008 John Deere Classic. He won once on the Nationwide Tour: the 2007 Fort Smith Classic. He has more than $5.9 million in career earnings on the PGA Tour.

Professional wins (2)

Nationwide Tour wins (1)

Nationwide Tour playoff record (0–1)

Other wins (1)
1991 Kansas Open

Playoff record
PGA Tour playoff record (0–2)

Results in major championships

CUT = missed the half-way cut
DQ = Disqualified
"T" = Tied
Note: Williamson never played in the Masters Tournament or the PGA Championship.

See also
1994 PGA Tour Qualifying School graduates
1995 PGA Tour Qualifying School graduates
1998 PGA Tour Qualifying School graduates
1999 PGA Tour Qualifying School graduates
2009 PGA Tour Qualifying School graduates

References

External links

American male golfers
PGA Tour golfers
Golfers from St. Louis
1967 births
Living people